Marokopa is a rural community in Waitomo District and Waikato region of New Zealand. It is located close to the coast between Awakino and Kawhia Harbour.

The area was settled by forestry workers in the 19th century. It has been predominantly a farming locale since the early 20th century. In 1911 a large dairy factory was built, which mainly made butter which was shipped to Auckland. The Awamarino factory was enlarged in 1932, but closed in 1937. A telephone link to Te Kuiti was completed in 1914 and a service car ran on Tuesdays and Fridays from 1920. The town also had a post office, a flaxmill and a school (1908-1982). There is a campground.

Demographics 
In 2018, Marokopa was in meshblocks 4002699-700. Previously, it was in meshblock 1019000. These meshblocks had these census results -

Geology 
The coast between Marokopa and Kiritehere is accessible at low tide. Along the few kilometres, a succession of Late Triassic and Jurassic rocks are exposed. They are part of the western limb of the Kawhia Syncline, which extends north to the Hakarimatas and have been described as the best Triassic sequence in the North Island. The rocks are youngest at Marokopa (Aratauran) and oldest to the south of Kiritehere (Otapirian), where there is a large bed of monotis, one of the index fossils.

Marae

Marokopa Marae and Miromiro i te Pō meeting house are a meeting ground for the local Ngāti Maniapoto hapū of Ngāti Kinohaku, Te Kanawa and Peehi.

See also
Phillips family disappearances

References

Populated places in Waikato
Waitomo District